Phidippus princeps is a species of jumping spider found in Canada and the eastern United States. These jumping spiders' vision exceeds by a factor of ten than that of a dragonfly's, which have the best vision among insects.

References

External links
 

Salticidae
Spiders of Canada
Spiders of the United States
Spiders described in 1883